Al-Jahra Governorate ( Muḥāfaẓat al-Ǧahrāʾ) is one of the six Governorates of Kuwait.  It is the largest Governorate in Kuwait. It includes the town of Al-Jahra, most of the northern and western parts of Kuwait, several islands (among them Bubiyan Island), and also western suburbs of Kuwait City.  It also contains most of Kuwait's arable land. Jahra also has some historic relevance to Kuwait's history. The Red Palace or Al Qasr Al Ahmar is the most important historical landmark there. 

Historically, Jahra was an agricultural oasis village and most Jahrans were farmers. Jahra's most notable residents included Sheikh Thuwainy Bin Abdullah Al-Saadoun (Sheikh of Al-Muntafiq) in 1786, when he fled from Baghdad to Suleiman Pasha. He wanted to occupy Basra and Sheikh Abdullah Al-Sabah hosted him until he returned to Baghdad after he was pardoned by the Iraqi governor. In 1925, Al Jahra administratively followed Kuwait City, and the population lived on the cultivation of palm trees and a little wheat and barley. Al Jahra contained 170 houses including the palace of Pasha al-Naqib and the palace of the Mubarak Al-Sabah. Nowadays Jahra is a modern city and farming has been reduced to various small farms. The geographic midpoint of Kuwait is located in this governorate.

Suburbs
Alabdally
Albhaith
Aljahra
Alkhwaisat
Almutlaa
Alnaeem
Alnaseem
Aloyoon
Alqaser
Alretqah
Alroudhatain
Alsalmy
Alsubbyah
Alsulaibya
Alwaha
Amghara
Boubyan island
Jaber Alahmad City
Kabd
Kazma
Om Alaish
Saad Alabdaullah City
Silk City
Taimaa
Warbah island

Government
Salim Sabah Nasir Mubarak I became governor of the Jahra Governorate in 1985.

Towns

Al Jahra'
Al `Ulaymiyah
Al `Arfajiyah
Umm Ghatti
Dulay` ar Rukham
Ghudayy
Bahrat al `Awjah
Khawr al `Awjah
Jazirat Bubiyan
Markaz Warbah
Jazirat Warbah
Jal az Zawr
Tubayj
`Ashish ad Dawhah
As Sab`ah
Makhfar as Sabiyah
Al Sabahiyah
Al `Arfajiyah
Al Bahrah
Al Hujayjah
Al Mahraqah
An Nuwaynis
Ar Rukham
As Sif
Ra's al Barshah
Qasr as Sabiyah
Sha`ib ar Rukham
Khawr as Sabiyah
Ra's as Sabiyah

See also
History of Kuwait

References

External links
Jahra Governorate official website

Governorates of Kuwait
Al Jahra Governorate